Juan Alderete de la Peña (born September 5, 1963) is an American musician, best known as the longtime bassist of Racer X, the Mars Volta and Marilyn Manson.

Biography
Alderete was born in Los Angeles, California the fourth of five children.  In the 1970s, the family moved to Novato of the San Francisco Bay Area.

Son of the late civil rights activist Angel Manuel Alderete, he was exposed to jazz music on a weekly basis by his father, who often played it around the Alderete household. Juan decided to pick up the bass after he and his friends decided to start a band. Other early influences included his brother's progressive rock albums, which included bands such as Yes, Rush, King Crimson, etc. He started learning the basics of the bass guitar when he was 16, and was influenced by such players as Jaco Pastorius, Geddy Lee, and Stanley Clarke. Some of his other influences include Jamaladeen Tacuma and John Entwistle, the bass player for the Who. His fascination with the bass guitar revolved around it being a somewhat "underappreciated" instrument at the time.

Alderete enrolled in Musicians Institute in Hollywood (Los Angeles, CA).  He enjoyed his time in the school, explaining that he was able to learn techniques and styles that he had never even considered prior to his enrollment. Alderete and fellow student Paul Gilbert started their musical relationship during an audition that Alderete held to find a drummer. Alderete showed up at the audition, bringing a Musician's Institute student and drum-playing friend named Bill Lescohier.  Although Lescohier was turned down for the part, Gilbert was impressed with Alderete's bass playing; the two quickly sought to form a speed metal band that would incorporate Gilbert's advanced neoclassical metal guitar technique with Alderete's solid bass lines.  To complete the band, Harry Gschoesser joined to fill the drummer position, and Jeff Martin became the vocalist; the group named themselves Racer X (a title that Lescohier had suggested).  With this lineup, the band released their debut album, Street Lethal, in 1986. Alderete has been recording with Racer X ever since (note: there was a ten-year hiatus starting from 1989), and their latest album was released in 2002, titled Getting Heavier. Alderete is credited as John Alderete on all Racer X albums.

However, four years after the creation of the band, Gilbert left Racer X to form the band Mr. Big.  The remaining members of Racer X decided to stay active in music, although they went their separate ways.  For the next ten years, Alderete would be involved in several different bands (including The Scream, DC-10, Big Sir, and Distortion Felix) as well as becoming an instructor at Musicians Institute.  Not long after, he released his first instructional video on bass techniques and modulation.

Although Extreme Volume II: Live was released in 1992, Racer X was not actually reunited.  That year, Paul Gilbert was touring with Mr. Big, and Alderete was recording with a hard rock band called The Scream.  In actuality, the album was just a compilation of songs that were recorded in concerts before the hiatus.  However, around 1999, Alderete got a telephone call from Paul Gilbert, who asked if there was any possibility of recording another Racer X album.  Juan agreed, and Racer X reunited to record Technical Difficulties, which features new material as well as older songs that were never recorded.

In 2003, while working as a radio producer, Alderete received a call from Omar Rodríguez-López of The Mars Volta while on their European tour with an offer to audition for the band:

He went on to record Frances The Mute with them in 2004, and has played bass on every Mars Volta album since, as well as a number of solo albums by Omar Rodríguez-López.  Since joining the band, he has played at Madison Square Garden and was featured on the front cover of the March 2005 issue of Bass Player Magazine.

Aside from The Mars Volta, Alderete has been invested in his own musical projects. Big Sir is a group composed of Juan and singer Lisa Papineau that has released four albums. Vato Negro is a group with a revolving door of musicians; originally a duo of Alderete and drummer Matt Sherrod, it has since featured Deantoni Parks, Omar Rodriguez-López, and Jon Theodore in various lineups. Alderete has played shows with both groups in 2010, in California and Fuji Rock Festival in Japan.

In addition, Alderete co-produced the film The Sentimental Engine Slayer with Rodríguez-López and former Mars Volta bandmate Paul Hinojos.

After The Mars Volta broke up in 2013, Alderete joined vocalist Cedric-Bixler Zavala in his new band, Zavalaz, and later became the touring bassist for Deltron 3030. Juan also runs a website dedicated to showcasing effects pedals and other musical gear called PedalsAndEffects.com.

Alderete also laid down the bass line for the late rapper and singer Lil Peep on his 2017 single "Benz Truck".

On November 5, 2017. Alderete filled in bass for Marilyn Manson at the Ozzfest Meets Knotfest festival, replacing longtime bassist Jeordie White, a.k.a. Twiggy Ramirez. He has been Manson's bass player on tour since.

Personal life
Alderete lives in Los Angeles with his wife, Anne.

On May 1, 2007, Alderete announced that he had been diagnosed with polycythemia vera, a rare blood disease. However he also mentioned that he was feeling fine, would experience no side effects from the medication, and would continue to play music.
Since discovering his condition, Alderete had agreed to become a spokesman for the MPD Foundation.

On January 13, 2020, Alderete sustained a serious brain injury as a result of a bicycle accident near his home. Despite wearing protective equipment, he was in a coma for almost four weeks. By September, he had undergone therapies and returned to playing bass.

Technique and equipment

Playing style
Influenced by players like Jaco Pastorius, Alderete's main playing technique is to use the "standard" fingers to pluck the strings with his right hand (two fingers: index and middle). He occasionally uses Dunlop Gel picks, as well as his signature picks. He is also known to use two-handed tapping techniques and slapping/popping, which was influenced by Louis Johnson, the bass player for the American funk and R&B band The Brothers Johnson. Alderete also cites Dr. Dre and Kool Keith of the hip hop group Ultramagnetic MCs as influences. While the two didn't formally play bass, Alderete looks to their bass lines for influence.

Bass guitars
 1971 Fretless Fender Precision Bass (his main bass guitar on Frances the Mute)
 1973 Fender Precision Bass
 1977 Fender Jazz Bass
 1986 Fender Jazz Bass
 1964 Fender Jazz Bass (recently with flatwound strings)
 Fender Geddy Lee Jazz bass guitars

The Laklands that Alderete had on tour are:

a white Darryl Jones Signature
a black custom fretless
a red Bob Glaub signature

Lakland had made Alderete a bass guitar that if popular, would become a signature model, assumed to be based on his modified 70's fretless Fender Jazz that he used during the Frances the Mute tour.

Darryl Jones model body
Fretless neck with painted lines
Volume/Volume/Tone. (Passive)
Precision/Jazz pickup orientation
"Curb" style thumb rest
Killswitch

For live shows he was most recently using a white model with a white pickguard and maple fingerboard.

Amplifiers

 Mid-'70s Ampeg SVT Amplifier (now Ampeg SVT-VR heads with 8x10" SVT cabs)
 Early '70s Acoustic 360 preamp and folded 18" cabinet (the "Jaco rig")

Alderete was featured on the first issue of the online magazine Resonate, talking about his Ampeg Rig.

Effects Pedals
A short, and incomplete, list: 
At least 3 Boss  CS-2 Compressor/Sustainers
MXR DC Brick
Electro-Harmonix Bass Synthesizer ('70s version)
Two DigiTech Whammy IV Pedals
moogerfooger MF-102 Ring Modulator
DigiTech Digital Delay
Boss LS-2 Line Selector
Fulltone Fuzz
Musitronics Mutron III
Musitronics Mutron Micro V
Electro-Harmonix Sovtek Fuzz (second issue)
MXR Phase 100
Digitech Bass Synth Wah
Boss PN-2 Pan Tremolo
Boss TU-2 Chromatic Tuner
Dunlop Bass Crybaby Wah
Boss OC-2 Octave
Boss DD-3 Digital Delay
Wren and Cuff Phat Phuk B
Wren and Cuff Tri Pie 70
Line 6 DL4 Delay
Ernie Ball Volume Pedal
DOD Meat Box Sub Octave Pedal
EarthQuaker Devices Hummingbird
EarthQuaker Devices Afterneath

Discography

With Racer X
Street Lethal (1986)
Second Heat (1988)
Extreme Volume Live (1988)
Extreme Volume II Live (1992)
Technical Difficulties (2000)
Superheroes (2000)
Snowball of Doom (2002)
Getting Heavier (2002)
Snowball of Doom 2 (2002)

With The Scream
Let It Scream (1991)
Takin' It to the Next Level (Recorded in 1993, unreleased)

With DC-10
 Co-Burn (1995)

With Distortion Felix
Record (1999)
I'm An Athlete (1999)

With Big Sir
Big Sir (2000)
Now That's What I Call Big Sir (2001)
Und Die Scheiße Ändert Sich Immer (2006)
Before Gardens After Gardens (2012)
Digital Gardens (2014)

With Halo Orbit
Halo Orbit (2016/2017)

With The Mars Volta
 Live (2003)
 Frances the Mute (2005)
 Scabdates (2005)
 Amputechture (2006)
 The Bedlam in Goliath (2008)
 Octahedron (2009)
 Noctourniquet (2012)

With Omar Rodríguez-López
Omar Rodriguez (2005)
Please Heat This Eventually (2006)
Se Dice Bisonte, No Búfalo (2007)
Omar Rodriguez-Lopez & Lydia Lunch (2007)
The Apocalypse Inside of An Orange (2007)
Calibration (2007)
Old Money (2008)
Cryptomnesia (2009)
Los Sueños de un Higado (2009)
Xenophanes (2009)
Sepulcros de Miel (2010)
Cizaña de los Amores (2010)
Mantra Hiroshima (2010)
Dōitashimashite (2010)
Equinox (2013)
Unicorn Skeleton Mask (2013)
Arañas en la Sombra (2016)
Cell Phone Bikini (2016)
Some Need It Lonely (2016)
Solid State Mercenaries (2017)

With Free Moral Agents
Control This (2010)

With Vato Negro
Bumpers (2008)
TBA – (TBA)

With Zavalaz
All Those Nights We Never Met (unreleased)

With Lil Peep
Come Over When You're Sober, Pt. 1 (2017)

With Marilyn Manson
We Are Chaos (2020)

Guest appearances
 MacAlpine – Eyes of the World (1990)
 Paul Gilbert – King of Clubs (1998)
 B'z – Action (2007)
 B'z – Ichibu to Zenbu/Dive (2009)
 Various artists – New World Man: A Tribute to Rush (2010)

References

External links
 Juan Alderete's Pedals and Effects
 Official Racer X Site
Big Sir Myspace
The Mars Volta, Bassist Juan Alderete, 4/01/2009
Juan Alderete on Bass guitar mag June/July?

1963 births
20th-century American bass guitarists
21st-century American bass guitarists
20th-century American male musicians
21st-century American male musicians
American heavy metal bass guitarists
American male bass guitarists
American musicians of Mexican descent
American rock bass guitarists
El Grupo Nuevo de Omar Rodriguez Lopez members
Grammy Award winners
Guitarists from San Francisco
Hispanic and Latino American musicians
Living people
Musicians Institute alumni
People from Novato, California
Racer X (band) members
The Mars Volta members
The Scream (band) members